The 1936–37 season was the 29th year of football played by Dundee United, and covers the period from 1 July 1936 to 30 June 1937.

Match results
Dundee United played a total of 35 matches during the 1936–37 season.

Legend

All results are written with Dundee United's score first.
Own goals in italics

Second Division

Scottish Cup

References

Dundee United F.C. seasons
Dundee United